The Half-Life video game series features many locations set in a dystopian future stemming from the events of the first game, Half-Life. These locations are used and referred to throughout the series. The locations, for the most part, are designed and modeled from real-world equivalent locations in Eastern Europe, but also include science fiction settings including the Black Mesa Research Facility, a labyrinthine subterranean research complex, and Xen, an alien dimension.

Half-Life and expansions

Black Mesa Research Facility 

The Black Mesa Research Facility (shortened to B.M.R.F) is the primary setting for Half-Life and its three expansions: Opposing Force, Blue Shift, and Decay. The base is a decommissioned ICBM launch complex at an undisclosed New Mexico desert location, which has been converted into a scientific research facility and bears a number of similarities to Los Alamos National Laboratory, Sandia National Laboratories and Area 51. This facility is depicted as a vast series of underground research laboratories as well as surface constructions such as offices, chemical waste disposal plants, and personnel dormitories (even cafeterias, where Gordon Freeman can destroy Doctor Magnusson's microwave casserole), all powered by a hydroelectric dam and connected by an advanced tram system.

Over the course of the series, Black Mesa is revealed to be conducting top-secret research into various fields, such as teleportation and experimental weapons research. Prior to the beginning of Half-Life, scientists experimenting on teleportation discover Xen, a border dimension somehow intrinsically involved in the teleportation process. Creatures and crystals from Xen are subsequently brought back to the facility for testing. At the beginning of Half-Life, one such crystal, revealed in Half-Life 2: Episode Two to have been provided by the G-Man, is put through an anti-mass spectrometer and causes a resonance cascade, tearing the spacetime continuum. As a result, Xen creatures are teleported into the facility and prey on its human inhabitants. There are many notable creatures that come from Xen, such as the Vortigaunts and Headcrabs.

The resulting crisis is seen from several points of view in Half-Life and its expansions. In Half-Life, protagonist Gordon Freeman is introduced to the facility in a notable sequence involving very little interactivity. This serves to foreshadow many of the challenges the player will face, as well as the labyrinth-like structure of the game. Eventually, the player fights through the facility and teleports to Xen to try to seal the tear from the other end, where a Xen creature is keeping it open. Blue Shift shows the events from the viewpoint of a security guard, Barney Calhoun, who joins a group of scientists who use the teleportation technology to evacuate survivors from the base. In Decay, another group of scientists attempt to close the tear through their own equipment, after calling in the U.S. Military to assist with the situation. The military situation is shown through the eyes of Adrian Shephard in Opposing Force, where U.S. Marines (referred to as HECU, or Hazardous Environment Combat Unit) are ordered to cover up the incident by killing the entire population of Black Mesa as well as the alien attackers, but are overwhelmed and forced to withdraw, allowing for black operations units to detonate a nuclear warhead in the facility, ultimately destroying it. However, the fracture in the spacetime continuum remains, allowing the Combine to invade and occupy Earth.

Black Mesa is also mentioned several times in another Valve game, Portal, and its sequel. In these games it is a competitor of Aperture Science, the company that owns the area where the games take place. Black Mesa is also referenced in the Portal-themed levels of Lego Dimensions, wherein Chell and Wheatley discover a hidden storage room in Aperture containing various crates and boxes stolen from Black Mesa.

Xen 
Xen is an alternative dimension and is the adopted home of the Vortigaunts. A collection of asteroids hanging over a nebula, Xen is briefly featured in Half-Life and its first two expansions, Opposing Force and Blue Shift. It is often referred to as the "border world", as it is somehow involved in the teleportation process used by the Black Mesa Research Facility. The player encounters multiple types of fauna such as Headcrabs in Xen, in addition to its sentient inhabitants. The asteroids are linked with their own teleporter system, and a number of asteroids are shown to include underground factory-like areas, where Vortigaunts work to create or mature Xen's military forces, including the large, blue ape-like alien called the Gargantua. Gravity in Xen is significantly lower than on Earth. Xen forms the setting for the closing parts of Half-Life, where Gordon Freeman travels to Xen to kill the Nihilanth and seal the spatial fracture to Black Mesa. The player briefly visits Xen in both Opposing Force and Blue Shift as well; in the former, Adrian Shephard is forced to travel to Xen to escape an otherwise enclosed area, while in the latter, Barney Calhoun goes to Xen to align some equipment to allow Black Mesa to be evacuated using the teleporters. After the death of the Nihilanth in Half-Life, the fracture is destabilized further, causing large amounts of Xen's wildlife to be teleported to locations across Earth.

In the third party remake of Half-Life Black Mesa, Xen is greatly expanded upon with many environments being completely new, such as a remote research facility operated by Black Mesa adjacent to a lush forest area as well as a village inhabited by enslaved Vortigaunt factory workers.

Half-Life 2 and its episodes

City 17 

City 17 is a dystopian metropolitan area that forms the primary setting for Half-Life 2, its first expansion, Episode One, and Half-Life: Alyx. The city features a variety of architectural styles, mostly Eastern European architecture dating from pre–World War II neoclassicism, to post-war revival of classical designs, Soviet modernism, and post-Soviet contemporary designs, as well as alien Combine structures. The playable area of the city is quite large, including plazas, railway stations, a dilapidated canal system, underground road tunnels, multiple communal living quarters and crowded, tightly-packed tenement buildings. The whole city seems to be in an advanced state of urban decay, with abandoned structures and graffiti rampant throughout the city. It contains a large number of signs written in Cyrillic. Signs advertising a "Café Baltic" can be occasionally seen, suggesting City 17 may be located on the Baltic Sea, rather than the Black Sea, as could also be the case. The city is policed by the Combine Civil Protection, who patrol the streets and suppress dissent with extreme brutality, which is seen frequently in Half-Life 2. Massive jumbotrons broadcast propaganda from Wallace Breen, the administrator of Earth. Travel and other luxuries are severely restricted, and citizens are under surveillance from floating drones.

According to Half-Life 2: Raising the Bar, the game's artbook, City 17 was inspired by elements from several European cities, such as Sofia, Belgrade, Budapest, Prague, and for the railyard in the game's introduction, Gare Saint-Lazare in Paris, France. Art director Viktor Antonov, after being approached by Valve, expressed an interest in moving 3D games out of 'corridors' and into realistic environments, with layered histories. Eastern Europe was chosen as the setting due to "the collision of the old and the new", resulting in strong influences from Sofia, Antonov's hometown, and George Orwell's dystopian novel 1984.

City 17 is the base of operations for the Combine on Earth, and its Citadel the headquarters for Wallace Breen, the human administrator for the Combine. The Citadel itself is an exceptionally tall structure of Combine design, reaching both deep underground and approximately 2.5 kilometers into the clouds, forming an ominous, foreboding presence in City 17's skyline. The Citadel serves as a reference point to help the player navigate, as well as providing a long-term goal to drive the player's action. In Half-Life 2, the player (as Gordon) initially arrives in City 17 by train; but, after being discovered, flees the city via its canal system. When Gordon returns later in the game, the city has been turned into a war zone as the citizens mount a full-scale rebellion against the Combine. The player eventually enters the Citadel itself to confront Breen, destroying the dark energy reactor and teleporter at the top of the Citadel. This proceeds to destabilize the Citadel's main reactor, which the player, accompanied by Alyx Vance, must temporarily stabilize in Episode One to allow for the population to be evacuated. The Combine try to accelerate the Citadel's collapse to send a message to their native dimension, requesting reinforcements. The Citadel eventually explodes at the end of Episode One, destroying City 17 and forming a super portal to the Combine dimension, which the player must work to collapse in Episode Two before Combine reinforcements arrive.

Black Mesa East 
Black Mesa East is the name of the base for the Lambda Resistance on the outskirts of City 17. It is featured briefly in Half-Life 2, where it acts as the base of operations for Eli Vance, the leader of the human Lambda Resistance against the ruling Combine. Situated alongside a hydroelectric dam outside City 17, Black Mesa East is mostly underground, consisting of several levels containing laboratories, kitchens, recreational areas and maintenance facilities. Its population includes both humans and Vortigaunts. The base is the primary destination for the player in the early stages of Half-Life 2 after an attempt to teleport directly to the facility fails (due to Dr. Kleiner's pet headcrab Lamarr), leaving Gordon Freeman to proceed there by conventional means. Shortly after Freeman's arrival, Judith Mossman alerts the Combine forces to his presence, resulting in the base being raided. Though Eli Vance tries to say not to go through Ravenholm, Gordon has no choice but to do so to escape, while Vance and Mossman are captured.

Ravenholm 

Ravenholm is an Eastern European mining town depicted in Half-Life 2. The town was a hidden location housing refugees from City 17 until it was discovered and attacked by the Combine, using artillery shells filled with headcrabs. Consequently, the town was massacred and its survivors zombified by the headcrabs. The tunnel from Black Mesa East is blocked to prevent the spread of the headcrabs and zombies. The mines are equally infested, and its structures have been heavily damaged. The town's sole survivor, Father Grigori, hunts the zombie population to put it out of its misery. Working from the church, Grigori has rigged numerous traps (one type involves a blade attached to an engine) and overhead walkways to keep himself safe.

The player journeys through Ravenholm to get to the coast, after Black Mesa East is attacked by the Combine. Ravenholm has been noted as a cross-over of the science fiction and survival horror genres, as the player encounters the level at night, and many dark areas allow for surprise attacks from the zombies and other creatures within the town. Ravenholm is challenging for players to navigate due to its open nature as well as its overall circular path.

Highway 17 
Highway 17 is a road featured in Half-Life 2 that runs along a stretch of coast outside City 17. The player travels through this area in a Tau-cannon-rigged dune buggy to get to Nova Prospekt. The area is heavily occupied by large insectoid creatures called antlions that live in underground hives and violently defend their sandy territory, though Gordon is eventually able to direct them to target the Combine instead. The area around the road is mostly coastal with multiple boathouses and jetties but the water level has been reduced to such an extent that the derelict ships are sitting on what was once the seabed. The road itself is in disrepair; several portions have collapsed, and it is cluttered with many abandoned cars. Highway 17 is interspersed with various outposts under control of the Lambda Resistance, although several of them are under attack or have already been destroyed when the player arrives at them.

Nova Prospekt 
Nova Prospekt is a security and detention installation controlled by the Combine in Half-Life 2. The facility is the player's destination for the middle parts of the game, as Gordon Freeman travels along the coast to get there and free the leader of the human resistance, Eli Vance, after he is captured by the Combine at Black Mesa East. Nova Prospekt is described as once being a high-security prison, set on a coastal cliff. Its interior is largely dilapidated, consisting of several unoccupied and badly damaged cell blocks, a number of interrogation chambers and numerous guard posts and checkpoints. The actual facility, built on the ruins of the old prison, incorporates Combine infrastructure, a teleporter, and a large holding area for political prisoners, held unconscious in pods suspended from the walls. The facility is also shown to deal with processing humans through invasive surgery, either changing them into Combine Overwatch soldiers or into Stalkers, dismembered cyborg slaves used for menial labor. The facility also incorporates an express train link from City 17. Nova Prospekt is heavily damaged during Gordon's incursion into the prison due to his use of antlions to break into the facility and rampage through it, as well as a subsequent teleporter explosion as he flees with Alyx Vance. The fight at Nova Prospekt is seen as the first strike against the Combine, and signals a major uprising in City 17.

White Forest 

White Forest is a fictional mountainous region in Eastern Europe that forms the setting for Half-Life 2: Episode Two. The area also contains a Soviet-era ICBM silo that acts as the base of operations for the human resistance against the Combine and is the primary destination for much of the game. White Forest is the only area of gameplay in Episode Two, and is depicted as a largely forest-land region near the base of several mountains. The area consists of several villages and minor resistance bases, connected by a road in a state of disrepair with a number of abandoned cars. Various other structures include radio stations, industrial warehouses and bridge houses, which are often infested with headcrabs. In addition, there are several mineshafts, which are shown to have been colonized by antlions. The player travels the forest roads in a salvaged 1969 Dodge Charger to reach the base. The base itself is used by the resistance as a platform to launch a rocket containing codes to shut down a Combine superportal that is opened in the wake of the destruction of the Citadel at the end of Episode One.

Other locations

Aperture Science Laboratories 

The Aperture Laboratories Computer-Aided Enrichment Center is an Aperture Science Innovators research facility built completely underground, that forms the setting of Portal and Portal 2. Aperture Science is a direct rival to Black Mesa and, as revealed by in-game information and a website for the fictional company, initially provided shower curtains for the US military. However, after receiving a US government award for Best Shower Curtain Contractor, its founder Cave Johnson shifted the company's focus and embarked on several ill-conceived projects, interdimensional portal research among them. The project was deemed worthwhile and government funding was granted to expand Aperture Science's facilities, using an old salt mine in Upper Michigan to give them nearly unlimited space, expanding the maximum dimensions of the facility to approximately 10 by 1 miles in width and 3 miles deep. This ultimately led to the installation of the "Genetic Lifeform and Disk Operating System", GLaDOS, an advanced artificial intelligence, revealed in Portal 2 to be based on the personality of Johnson's assistant Caroline; however, shortly after its installation, GLaDOS turned on its creators, connecting the facility's ventilation system to a neurotoxin generator and imprisoning the survivors (including the player character Chell) for later use as test subjects.

The areas of the underground Enrichment Center seen by the player in Portal consists of clinically white "test chambers", overlooked by laboratories and office spaces devoid of life, and disused maintenance areas behind these chambers. The clinical feel was designed after the settings in the film The Island, aiming to reduce the amount of background detail to allow players to focus on the puzzles. In Portal 2, however, the facility has been overgrown by plant life and has fallen into disarray after many years. GLaDOS is able to rapidly restore the chambers to their pristine conditions after being reactivated, showing the capability of highly configurable testing chambers. Later, the player travels deeper underground through the mine revealing earlier sections of Aperture Science from the 1950s to the 1980s, which have a more industrial style. Recordings from Cave Johnson during these areas relate the gradual decline of the company's fortunes, going from performing tests of its discoveries on elite personnel from the military, to using paid volunteers, and finally to requiring mandatory testing of its employees, and this directive became the basis for GLaDOS' core programming. At the end of Portal 2, the player reaches the surface, revealing that one of the accesses to the facility is a run-down shed in the middle of a wheat field.

In Half-Life 2: Episode Two, the player learns that the Borealis, an Aperture Science research vessel, and a portion of the drydock it was moored to, was somehow teleported to the Arctic, and is a point of interest that the player is told to investigate. Episode Two concludes as the player prepares to visit this location. Portal 2 includes the surviving portion of the drydock deep in the Aperture Science facility where the Borealis was originally located before its disappearance.

St. Olga 

St. Olga is a seaside town featured in Half-Life 2: Lost Coast, provided to players as a technology demonstration of high dynamic range rendering in the Source engine. St. Olga is built near a seaside cliff and features an Eastern Orthodox monastery at the top of the cliff, which the Combine have made a base of operations to launch artillery shells filled with headcrabs into the town. In Lost Coast, the player controls Freeman as he meets an old fisherman from St. Olga who asks him to defeat the Combine. Freeman storms the monastery and disables the artillery launcher, then returns to the fisherman, who congratulates him. The church style was specifically selected to enhance the influence of the high dynamic range rendering, while the cliff-side environments were built to encourage combat strategies in the vertical direction.

Reception
The environments of both Half-Life and Half-Life 2 and their expansions have been well received by critics.

The locations in Half-Life have been praised as "self-contained, believable, and thoroughly engaging" by GameSpot, who also noted the "distinct looks" used in different areas throughout the game. The moment when the player arrives at the alien world of Xen towards the end of the game in particular has been praised for inspiring a sense of awe and astonishment. In addition, several reviews praised the way that players progressed through the areas of Black Mesa and the loading points in between as "largely seamless", with Computer and Video Games commenting that this made level loading "a thing of the past".  However, some aspects of level design were criticized: IGN in particular, despite describing the locations as "logically linked and fun to explore" noted that in the middle of the game "the tension seriously sags, as [the player is] forced to wander around some dreadful tunnels looking for switches in retro-gaming land, as jumping puzzles, switch hunts, and all the tedium of a dozen other games returns in force".

PC Zone described the environments in Half-Life 2 as "breathtaking, diverse and immense", while GameSpot praised the locations as "simply stunning, from the plazas and streets of City 17 to the rusted interiors of an abandoned factory" and stated that the game featured "excellent level design". In addition, IGN noted that the game world is "immaculately crafted and rendered". City 17 has been noted for its aesthetic use of 3D sound. Sound is used to remind the player of the trashy style of their train as they arrive in the city, while the sound of the surveillance camera in the large resonant space creates a generally unpleasant feeling. While some reviewers felt disappointment at the lack of new locations in Episode One, the entirely new rural environments in Episode Two were significantly praised by critics. The Computer and Video Games magazine stated that Episode Two contained "wonderful art design and the odd bit of technical spit-shine", while IGN praised the "expansive" outdoor environments and "claustrophobic" tunnels featured in White Forest.

Fumito Ueda, lead developer for Ico and Shadow of the Colossus, has stated that Half-Life 2 incorporates a "natural setting", and "the puzzles are incorporated in that natural setting, and the players don't get lost. And that's something we put a lot of effort into for Ico, so I understand what went into that."

References

External links

Locations in the Half-Life series at Combine OverWiki, a Half-Life wiki

Half-Life (series)
Video game locations
Half-Life
Half-Life